Expectations is the debut studio album by American singer-songwriter Katie Pruitt, released by Rounder Records on February 21, 2020. The album has received positive reviews from critics. The album is made up of compositions about Pruitt's life. On November 24, 2020, Expectations was nominated for a Grammy for Best Engineered Album, Non-Classical.

Reception

 Album of the Year characterized the critical consensus as a 75 out of 100. For Paste, Eric R. Danton gave Expectations a seven out of 10, praising the emotional depth of the lyrics but criticizing formulaic songwriting and some lyrics that fall flat. Sam Sodomsky of Pitchfork gave it the same rating, writing that it has strong arrangements and stately ballads. In Exclaim!, Scott Roos gave it an eight out of 10 for truth-telling lyrics and a "first-rate" band. American Songwriters Hal Horowitz scored Expectations at four out of five for wise production that accentuates her lyrics, along with a balance of musical genres. Introducing Pruitt for a feature, Kelly McCartney of No Depression, called the release "stunning" and continued, "As an artist’s opening statement, the album is bold and beautiful, impactful and entertaining. It’s an exercise in courage so exquisitely raw that Brown would surely be proud of it." Joseph Hudak of Rolling Stone praised Pruitt's "nimble guitar playing" and "elastic voice". NPR's Jewly Hight characterized the album with, "Pruitt's done that with such clarity of expression and disarming intimacy—Expectations is aesthetically warmhearted even in its tensest moments of confrontation—that she's given her own family a greater understanding of her experience".

Track listing
All songs written by Katie Pruitt, except where noted
"Wishful Thinking" – 5:10
"My Mind's a Ship (That's Going Down)" (Jess Nolan and Pruitt) – 4:00
"Expectations" (Ross McReynolds and Pruitt) – 3:55
"Out of the Blue" – 5:13
"Normal" – 5:12
"Grace Has a Gun" – 4:21
"Searching for the Truth" – 4:32
"Georgia" – 4:11
"Loving Her" – 5:04
"It's Always Been You" – 5:13

Personnel
Katie Pruitt – lead and backing vocals, acoustic and electric guitars, liner notes, production
Hank Born – electric guitar
Maggie Chaffee – cello
David Crutcher – Fender Rhodes, organ, piano
Eric Darken – bells, vibraphone
Alicia Enstrom – violin
Luke Enyeart – electric guitar
Laura Epling – violin
Alysse Gafkjen – photography
Austin Hoke – cello
Jedd Hughes – electric guitar
Calvin Knowles – bass guitar
Betsy Lamb – viola
Ross McReynolds – drums, percussion
Ian Miller – African bells, Fender Rhodes, keyboards, Mellotron, organ, piano
Jess Nolan – backing vocals
Jake Ohlbaum – backing vocals
Gary Paczosa – engineering
Michael Robinson – engineer, production
Carrie Smith – design
Jake Tudor – viola
Kristin Webber – violin
Sami Wideberg – artwork
Johnny Williamson – electric guitar

See also
List of 2020 albums

References

External links

Rounder Records press release
A set by Pruitt on NPR's World Cafe

2020 debut albums
Katie Pruitt albums
Rounder Records albums
LGBT-related albums